The Roman Catholic Diocese of Chełmno was a Roman Catholic diocese in Chełmno Land, founded in 1243 and disbanded in 1992.

History 
 It was founded in 1243 by the papal legate William of Modena in the Monastic state of the Teutonic Knights, along with the three other bishoprics Ermland (Warmia), Samland (in Sambia) and Pomesania. Initially Culm was a suffragan to the Archdiocese of Riga and had its seat in Chełmża (Culmsee), where the cathedral chapter was domiciled till 1824.

 From 1257 to 1782 the episcopal seat was the castle in Lubawa.
 In 1454, the region was reincorporated by King Casimir IV Jagiellon to the Kingdom of Poland.
 In 1466, the region was confirmed as part of Poland, and the diocese was agreed to pass to the Archdiocese of Gniezno.
 After 1525 Chełmno incorporated southern parts of the Pomesanian diocesan area (with Łasin and Nowe Miasto), which happened to be in the Chełmno Voivodeship. Whereas western Pomesanian diocesan area in the Malbork Voivodeship was administered by Chełmno, but officially maintaining its naming.
 After Riga's dissolution in 1566 the bishops of Chełmno attended the councils of the Ecclesiastical province of the metropolitan of Gniezno. This practice was recognised by the Holy See by the Bull De salute animarum in 1821, when Chełmno became de jure a suffragan of the Archdiocese of Gniezno. Chełmno diocese was enlarged on that occasion (Górzno, Krajna and Działdowo).
 Annexation of the diocesan area in the First Partition of Poland in 1772 and Second Partition of Poland in 1793 by the Kingdom of Prussia.
 From 1782 to 1824 the episcopal seat was in Chełmża.

 In 1824, episcopal seat moved to Pelplin.
 In 1871, the diocesan area became part of Germany.
 Restoration of independent Poland after World War I; reintegration of Chełmno with Poland in 1920.
 Pope Pius XI decided to separate 18 parishes in the territory the Free City of Danzig west of the Vistula from the diocese and to establish an Apostolic Administrator of the Free City of Danzig on 24 April 1922, which was directly subordinated to the Pope.
 On 1 May 1923 the Holy See disentangled from the Diocese of Chełmno the deaneries in Bütow (Bytów),  Lauenburg in Pomerania (Lębork) as well as those included in the Posen-West Prussia Border March, and transferred them to the new Apostolic Administration of Tütz, later transformed into the Prelature of Schneidemühl (Piła).
 In 1925 a concordat between Poland and the Holy See was signed and the Apostolic Administrator was now supposed to be subordinated to the Nuncio of Warsaw, which caused protests among the local populace. Thus, the Pope established the sui iuris Diocese of Danzig on  30 December 1925 and appointed Edward O'Rourke as the first Bishop on 2 January 1926. The deanery of Pomesania in that eastern part of West Prussia which remained with Germany after the 1920 East and West Prussian plebiscites was transferred to the Diocese of Warmia in 1925.
 As part of the reorganisation of the Catholic Church in the People’s Republic of Poland in 1972, also accounting for changes of political border in 1945, the diocese of Gdansk was enlarged on the expenses of Chelmno diocese, whereas the latter gained parishes previously part of the Berlin diocese and the Prelature of Schneidemühl (Piła)
 As part of the reorganisation of the Catholic Church in the Third Polish Republic, the extant Diocese of Chełmno was split in 1992 by Pope John Paul II into the Diocese of Pelplin and the Diocese of Toruń

List of Bishops of Kulm/Chełmno 

 1245–1263: Heidenreich Ordo fratrum Praedicatorum, Dominican Order (O.P.)
 1264–1274: Friedrich von Hausen Ordo Teutonicus, Teutonic Order (O.T.)
 1275–1291: Werner OT
 1291/92–1301: Heinrich Schenk OT
 1303–1311: Herman OT
 1311–1316/19: Eberhard OT
 1319–1323: Mikołaj Afri OP
 1323–1349: Otto OT
 1349–1359: Jacob OT
 1359–1363: Johann Schadland OP
 1363–1381/85: Wikbold Dobilstein OT
 1385–1390: Reinhard von Sayn
 1390: Martin von Lynow OT
 1390–1398: Nikolaus Schippenbeil OT
 1398–1402: Jan Kropidło
 1402–1416: Arnold Stapil OT
 1416–1457: Johann Marienau
 1457–1479: Wincenty Kiełbasa
 1480–1495: Stefan of Nibork
 1496–1507: Mikołaj Chrapicki
 1508–1530: Jan Konopacki

 1530–1538: Johannes Dantiscus
 1538–1549: Tiedemann Giese
 1549–1551: Stanislaus Hosius
 1551–1562: Jan Lubodzieski
 1562–1571: Stanisław Żelisławski SOC
 1574–1595: Piotr Kostka
 1595–1600: Piotr Tylicki
 1600–1610: Wawrzyniec Gembicki
 1611–1613: Maciej Konopacki
 1614–1624: Jan Kuczborski
 1624–1635: Jakub Zadzik
 1635–1639: Jan Lipski
 1639–1646: Kasper Działyński

 1646–1652: Andrzej Leszczyński
 1653–1655: Jan Gembicki
 1658–1661: Adam Koss
 1662–1674: Andrzej Olszowski
 1676–1681: Jan Małachowski
 1681–1693: 
 1693–1694: 
 1699–1712: Teodor Andrzej Potocki
 1719–1721: 
 1723–1730: 
 1731–1733:  SOC
 1736–1739: Adam Stanisław Grabowski
 1739–1746: Andrzej Stanisław Załuski
 1747–1758:  SOC
 1759–1785: 
 1785–1795: Karl von Hohenzollern-Hechingen
 1795–1814: 

 1824–1832: Ignacy Stanisław Matthy
 1834–1856: Anastazy Sedlag
 1857–1886: Johannes von der Marwitz
 1886–1898: Leon Redner
 1899–1926: Augustin Rosentreter
 1926–1944: Stanisław Wojciech Okoniewski
 1946–1972: Kazimierz Józef Kowalski
 1973–1980: Bernard Czapliński
 1981–1992: Marian Przykucki

Notes and references

External links
 GCatholic.org
 Catholic Hierarchy

Roman Catholic Diocese of Chełmno
Dioceses established in the 13th century
Establishments in the State of the Teutonic Order
Former Roman Catholic dioceses in Poland
Religious organizations established in the 1240s
Roman Catholic Diocese of Chełmno
Religious organizations disestablished in 1992
Suppressed Roman Catholic dioceses